Daniel Goode (born January 24, 1936) is an American composer and clarinetist.

Daniel Goode was born in New York City. After graduating in 1957 from Oberlin College, he studied composition at Columbia University with Henry Cowell and Otto Luening, receiving an MA 1962. He pursued further studies at the University of San Diego with Pauline Oliveros and Kenneth Gaburo (Benary and Sandow 2001).

Goode's works show influence from several sources, including bird song, Cape Breton fiddling, drone, Indonesian gamelan music, and minimal music (specifically music as a gradual process).  Often two or more of these elements are combined in a single composition.

Goode created and served as Director of the Electronic Music Studio of Livingston College, Rutgers University from 1971 to 1998 and is co-director of the DownTown Ensemble which he co-founded in New York in 1983 (Benary and Sandow 2001).  As a clarinetist he is proficient in the technique of circular breathing, which he uses frequently in performances with the group.

Since 1976, Goode has been a member of Gamelan Son of Lion, a Javanese-style iron gamelan ensemble dedicated to new music, for which he has composed many works.  He has developed a special keyless clarinet made from a length of plastic pipe that allows him to play in the Indonesian slendro tuning system, which he plays with the group on occasion.

His works are published by Frog Peak Music and Theodore Presser.

References
 Benary, Barbara, and Gregory Sandow. 2001. "Goode, Daniel". The New Grove Dictionary of Music and Musicians, second edition, edited by Stanley Sadie and John Tyrrell. London: Macmillan Publishers.
 Goode, Daniel. 2005. "Daniel Goode:  Juicy Cantata—Violence in America". Leonardo Music Journal 15 (December): 84–85. (accessed 16 February 2010)

External links
Daniel Goode page at Frog Peak Music
Composer's website
Daniel Goode page at Kalvos
SoundArt Daniel Goode page
Composers21 Daniel Goode page
Music Mavericks Daniel Goode interview
MySpace Daniel Goode page

1936 births
20th-century American composers
20th-century American male musicians
20th-century clarinetists
20th-century classical composers
21st-century American composers
21st-century American male musicians
21st-century clarinetists
21st-century classical composers
American classical clarinetists
American classical composers
American contemporary classical composers
American male classical composers
Contemporary classical music performers
Living people
Tzadik Records artists